Alpine Creek is a small river in San Mateo County, California.

Alpine Creek passes through Russian Ridge Open Space Preserve and Heritage Grove Redwood Preserve.

References

See also
List of watercourses in the San Francisco Bay Area

Rivers of San Mateo County, California
Santa Cruz Mountains
Rivers of Northern California